The Le Sueur Municipal Airport  is an airport on the south side of Le Sueur, Minnesota, United States. It is located on Minnesota State Highway 112. The airport hosts a variety of events, including fly-ins and pancake breakfasts.

Facilities and aircraft

It has one asphalt paved runways: 13/31 is 3,005 by 75 feet (915 x 30 m) and 2/20 is 3,300 by 75 feet (1,006 x 23 m).

For the 12-month period ending August 31, 2019, the airport had 2,550 aircraft operations, an average of 7 per day. It consisted of 98% of general aviation and 2% military. For the same time period, there were 31 aircraft based at the field: 16 helicopters and 15 single-engine airplanes.

The airport has a city-operated FBO offering fuel.

Accidents & Incidents
On June 24, 1996, a Farland Genesis impacted terrain after a loss of control while operating a local flight at the airport. The student pilot aboard received fatal injuries. Witnesses reported the takeoff seemed normal, but the pilot did a 180-degree turn 100 feet above the ground. The plane veered right and gradually lost altitude until it nosed over. The probable cause was found to be the pilot's impaired judgement due to drugs and failure to control the aircraft, resulting in an uncontrolled descent into terrain.
On July 13, 2022, a hang glider crashed into a lake nearby in Le Sueur county. The sole pilot was rescued. The crash is under investigation.

Nearby airports

Fairmont Municipal Airport
Flying Cloud Airport
Glencoe Municipal Airport	
Hutchinson Municipal Airport
New Ulm Municipal Airport
Mankato Regional Airport
Minneapolis-St. Paul International Airport
St. James Municipal Airport
St. Paul Downtown Airport
Waseca Municipal Airport

References

External links

Airports in Minnesota
Buildings and structures in Le Sueur County, Minnesota
Transportation in Le Sueur County, Minnesota